Tippmannia is a genus of beetles in the family Cerambycidae, containing the following species:

 Tippmannia bucki (Lane, 1973)
 Tippmannia olivascens (Lane, 1973)
 Tippmannia rhamnusioides (Tippmann, 1953)

References

Hesperophanini